John Wilson Stratton (7 November 1925 – 25 October 1991) was a British actor, born in Clitheroe, Lancashire, where he kept his permanent home.

He is perhaps best known for his early film roles during the fifties, where he played the young apprentice parts of Ferraby and Ward opposite Jack Hawkins in both The Cruel Sea (1953) and The Long Arm (1956) respectively. He played a similar role on television in the third Quatermass serial Quatermass and the Pit, essaying the role of Captain Potter opposite André Morell's Professor Bernard Quatermass.

Older and less boyish by the sixties, he emerged as character actor of some range, playing numerous roles in many television programmes of the decade including the part of alcoholic journalist Fred Blane in It's Dark Outside. Other TV appearances include Dixon of Dock Green, The Avengers, Armchair Theatre, The Man in Room 17, Public Eye, Mr. Rose, Z-Cars, Sherlock Holmes (playing Inspector Athelney Jones), Coronation Street, UFO ("E.S.P." episode), The Rivals of Sherlock Holmes, Hadleigh, The Forgotten Story, Softly, Softly, The Pallisers, Fall of Eagles, Backs to the Land, The Professionals, Doctor Who (in the serial The Two Doctors), Juliet Bravo, The Trinity Tales and Lovejoy.

Selected filmography
 The Small Back Room (1949) - Young Army Officer at Committee Meeting (uncredited)
 The Cure for Love (1949) - Sam
 Seven Days to Noon (1950) - Army Mechanic (uncredited)
 Appointment with Venus (1951) - 1st.R.A.F. Officer
 The Happy Family (1952) - David
 The Cruel Sea (1953) - Lieutenant Ferraby
 The Long Arm (1956) - Detective Sergeant Ward
 The Man in the Sky (1957) - Peter Hook
 Seven Waves Away (1957) - Jimmy 'Sparks' Clary
 The Challenge (1960) - Rick
 Frankenstein and the Monster from Hell (1974) - Asylum Director

References

External links
 

1925 births
1991 deaths
English male television actors
People from Clitheroe
20th-century English male actors